The members of the House of Representatives of the Netherlands for Forum for Democracy is a list of all members of the House of Representatives who have been members of the Forum for Democracy faction.

List

Notes

References 

Forum for Democracy